Aklanon may refer to:
 Aklanon people, of the Aklan province in the Philippines
 Aklanon language, their Austronesian language

See also
 Aklan (disambiguation)

Language and nationality disambiguation pages